Pavol Adami (Slovak), Adámi Pál (Hungarian), Paul Adami (German) (9 July 1739, in Beluša – 21 September 1795) was a Slovak scientist and scholar, considered one of the world's first veterinarians. He was one of the first recorded experts in the infectious diseases of animals.

External links
mek.oszk.hu 

1739 births
1795 deaths
18th-century Hungarian physicians
18th-century Slovak people
Slovak scientists
Slovak biologists
Hungarians in Slovakia
People from Púchov District